
Gmina Łubowo is a rural gmina (administrative district) in Gniezno County, Greater Poland Voivodeship, in west-central Poland.

Villages
Gmina Łubowo contains the villages and settlements of Baranowo, Chwałkówko, Dziekanowice, Fałkowo, Imielenko, Imielno, Lednogóra, Leśniewo, Łubowo, Moraczewo, Myślęcin, Owieczki, Pierzyska, Przyborowo, Rybitwy, Rzegnowo, Siemianowo, Strychowo, Wierzyce, Woźniki and Żydówko.

Neighbouring gminas
Gmina Łubowo is bordered by the gminas of Czerniejewo, Gniezno, Kiszkowo, Kłecko and Pobiedziska.

References
Polish official population figures 2006

Lubowo
Gniezno County